Pseudoclanis diana is a moth of the family Sphingidae. It is known from Angola and Namibia.

References

Pseudoclanis
Moths described in 1922
Moths of Africa
Insects of Namibia